Killer Tomatoes Strike Back! is a 1991 American comedy film. It is the third in the Killer Tomatoes film series, following Attack of the Killer Tomatoes (1978) and Return of the Killer Tomatoes (1988), and followed by Killer Tomatoes Eat France (1992). The film is notable in that it is the first time killer tomatoes are shown with faces and was the only killer tomatoes film that did not begin with the traditional Killer Tomatoes score, although remixes play during the film. The film was a direct-to-video release.

Plot
Police assistant Lance Boyle is a childish detective who is lumbered with worthless police cases. However, after several murders in a nearby wood that concern Killer Tomatoes, Lance finds himself working alongside Kennedy Johnson, a Tomatologist, to solve the murders.

Nearby, Professor Mortimer Gangreen (John Astin) has begun using subliminal mind control on his talk show, disguised as talk show host Jeronahew. After kidnapping members of the Press and Media, Gangreen and his assistant Igor plot to use his brainwashed Press members, as well as the Subliminal Mind control, to overpower the human race and make the world a planet run by himself and his killer tomatoes, though he has rather childish plans for world domination: "Next time I fly; my bags will not be the last ones on the carousel!" as well as planning to reward Igor with "the K-Mart in East Rutherford".

Following countless killer tomatoes attacks, Lance and Kennedy finally reach Gangreen's hideout, where they must pit themselves against killer tomatoes, brainwashed newsreaders and a giant Bacon, Lettuce and Human sandwich, of which Kennedy may be a part. With help from FT, (Fuzzy Tomato, from Return of the Killer Tomatoes) Lance rescues Kennedy and Gangreen is defeated, left at the mercy of the hungry killer tomatoes.

References to earlier movies
 Special Agent Sam Smith is now working in a bar catering to tomatoes. Boyle asks him for a Bloody Mary, referencing the bonfire scene in Attack of The Killer Tomatoes.
 At Media Appreciation Day Charles White is trampled underfoot, similar to his last scene in Return of The Killer Tomatoes.
 Police Inspector Finletter is seen carrying several sheets of fax paper, a reference to his parachute in the first film.
 Mrs. Williams from the first movies is seen trying to open a bank account. Once again being interrupted and confronted by a tomato.

References to other movies
 Detectives Boyle and Rood parody Riggs and Murtaugh in Lethal Weapon.
 The first victims of tomatoes is a nude girl and a hockey player, in reference to Friday the 13th.
 The shower scene from Psycho is parodied in its entirety.

Cast
Rick Rockwell as Lance Boyle
Crystal Carson as Kennedy Johnson
Steve Lundquist as Igor
John Witherspoon as Evan Rood
John Astin as Professor Mortimer Gangreen
Kevin West as Bank Teller
J. Stephen Peace as Captain Wilbur Finletter
John De Bello as Charles White
Frank Davis as Sam Smith

References

External links

1991 films
1990s parody films
Attack of the Killer Tomatoes
Films about food and drink
Parodies of horror
1990s comedy horror films
1991 comedy films
1990s English-language films